Operosa is an annual classical music and opera festival. 
Devoted mainly to opera, it also includes concerts of orchestral, chamber, vocal and solo instrumental music. Operosa is active in the Balkan region with the main festival event in Herceg Novi in Montenegro.

History 

Operosa was founded by Finnish mezzo-soprano Katherine Haataja in 2006. It was founded with the purpose of promoting young opera and classical music talent and actively providing production work opportunities to young artists. The first open air opera festival was launched in June 2007 in Varna, Bulgaria in the open air of the Euxinograd castle garden with the opera Don Giovanni by W.A. Mozart. The following year festival performances were held in Sofia at the Ivan Vazov National Theatre. Operosa returned to Euxinograd in 2009 and 2010 with performances of La Voix Humaine by Francis Poulenc, and Roméo et Juliette by Charles Gounod.

In 2011 Operosa produced opera performances in Belgrade in Serbia at the Belgrade Youth Center. It was the first time an opera was performed at the center.  2012 was dedicated to baroque opera with workshops, master classes and performances of Pimpinone opera by Georg Philipp Telemann at the Ilija M. Kolarac Endowment in Belgrade in Serbia as well as at Betahaus in Sofia, Bulgaria. In 2013 Operosa participated in performances at the Night of Culture event in Herceg Novi in Montenegro. Operosa produced the very first international full-scale opera performance in Montenegro in Porto Montenegro in Tivat in September 2014 with Roméo et Juliette by Charles Gounod.

Since 2015 the Operosa Montenegro Opera Festival has taken place in the Old Town, the Forte Mare and the Kanli Kula Fortress open air amphitheater in Herceg Novi, Montenegro.

A dedicated educational program (Operosa Academia) was initiated in 2012 and is active in Bulgaria, Serbia and Montenegro. It provides training all year round for young opera and classical music artists with master classes, workshops and smaller scale opera performances. Operosa also supports young artists with awards and stipends.

Operosa has collaboration and exchange schemes with international opera establishments such as Aix-en-Provence Festival, Queen Elisabeth Music Chapel, Aldeburgh Music Helsinki Festival, La Monnaie, Dutch National Opera and Calouste Gulbenkian Foundation through the ENOA network of European opera academies.

In 2017 Operosa was selected for co-funding by the European Union programme for culture Creative Europe. The project YOUNG@OPERA  was created by Operosa in cooperation with partners Herceg Novi municipality and Ilija M. Kolarac Endowment with performances across Montenegro, Serbia and Bulgaria.

Artists 

Artists who have performed and worked at Operosa include mezzo-soprano Jennifer Larmore, soprano Darina Takova, alto Marijana Mijanovic, mezzo-soprano Katherine Haataja, set designer Jamie Vartan, stage director John La Bouchardiere, stage director Martin Lloyd-Evans, stage director and designer Tim Hopkins, stage director Seth Yorra, stage director Ashley Dean, lighting and set designer Simon Corder, costume and set designer Domenico Franchi, set designer Cordelia Chisholm, lighting designer Kevin Treacy, organist and harpsichordist Jeremy Joseph,  conductor Eraldo Salmieri, conductor Predrag Gosta, Sofia Symphonic Orchestra, Varna Philharmonic Society Chamber Orchestra and Montenegrin Symphony Orchestra

Past productions
Operosa events take place across the Balkan region and since its inauguration have included the following productions.

2007: Don Giovanni by W.A. Mozart (Euxinograd, Varna, Bulgaria)
2008: Opera & Arabesque Ballet (Ivan Vazov National Theatre, Sofia, Bulgaria)
2009: La Voix Humaine by Francis Poulenc (Euxinograd, Varna, Bulgaria)
2010: Roméo et Juliette by Charles Gounod (Euxinograd, Varna, Bulgaria)
2011: La Voix Humaine by Francis Poulenc (Belgrade Youth Center, Belgrade, Serbia)
2012: Pimpinone by Georg Philipp Telemann (Ilija M. Kolarac Endowment, Belgrade, Serbia)
2012: Pimpinone by Georg Philipp Telemann (Betahaus, Sofia, Bulgaria)
2013: La Voix Humaine by Francis Poulenc (Night of Culture, Herceg Novi, Montenegro)
2014: Roméo et Juliette by Charles Gounod (Porto Montenegro, Tivat, Montenegro)
2015: Cosi Fan Tutte by W.A. Mozart (Kanli Kula, Herceg Novi, Montenegro)
2015: Lo Speziale by Joseph Haydn (Studentski kulturni centar, Belgrade, Serbia)
2016: La Cenerentola by Gioachino Rossini (Kanli Kula, Herceg Novi, Montenegro)
2017: La Serva Padrona by Giovanni Battista Pergolesi (Studentski kulturni centar, Belgrade, Serbia)
2017: Iolanta by Pyotr Ilyich Tchaikovsky (Kanli Kula, Herceg Novi, Montenegro)
2018: La Serva Padrona by Giovanni Paisiello (Bansko, Sofia, Gabrovo and Pleven in Bulgaria)
2018: La Serva Padrona by Giovanni Paisiello (Herceg Novi, Kotor, Bar and Podgorica in Montenegro)
2018: Carmen by Georges Bizet (Kanli Kula, Herceg Novi, Montenegro)
2018: La Serva Padrona by Giovanni Paisiello (Pančevo, Šabac, Sombor and Belgrade in Serbia)
2019: Džumbus by Milica Ilić (Berkovica, Sofia, Chavdar and Montana in Bulgaria)
2019: Be My Superstar - A Contemporary Tragedy by Šimon Voseček and Alexandra Lacroix based on text by Yann Verburgh (Dvorana Park, Herceg Novi, Montenegro)
2019: A Midsummer Night's Dream (Mendelssohn) by Felix Mendelssohn (Kanli Kula, Herceg Novi, Montenegro)
2019: Džumbus Music by Milica Ilić, Text Jovan Stamatović-Karić (Herceg Novi, Bijelo polje and Berane in Montenegro)

Other media
In 2007 Operosa released a recording named “Perle” under the label Orpheus Music. It features works by W.A. Mozart, G. Rossini, G.F. Handel, A. Vivaldi and Giulio Caccini performed by the Sofia Symphonic Orchestra together with conductor Nayden Todorov, mezzo-soprano Katherine Haataja, guitar by Rosen Balkanski and harpsichord by Magdalena Vasileva.

In 2012 Operosa launched an online social media platform for opera and classical music artists called the Operosa Forum. The majority of its users are young aspiring artists from divers parts of the world.

See also 

List of opera festivals
Euxinograd
Varna
Herceg Novi
Kanli Kula

References

External links 
www.operosa.org

Music festivals in Montenegro
Music festivals in Serbia
Classical music festivals in Serbia
Music festivals established in 2006
Opera festivals